Willi Remer (born 27 July 1908, date of death unknown) was a German modern pentathlete. He competed at the 1932 Summer Olympics.

References

1908 births
Year of death missing
German male modern pentathletes
Olympic modern pentathletes of Germany
Modern pentathletes at the 1932 Summer Olympics
Sportspeople from Rostock